Juan Miguel Rivera Bondoc (born May 12, 1977), professionally known as Onemig Bondoc, is a Filipino actor and television host. He was known for his roles in shows like T.G.I.S. and its spin-off Growing Up shown on GMA Network. He later became an ABS-CBN talent, seen on several films and television series of the network, including Ngayong Nandito Ka with Kristine Hermosa and Jericho Rosales.

Bondoc was born to businessman Mariano Bondoc, Jr. and Milo Rivera. He is the eldest of four. He was to follow the footsteps of his father in his father's stock brokerage firm when showbiz came calling.

Bondoc spent most of his high school and grade school at La Salle Greenhills. He left the country and finished high school at Port Alberni, British Columbia, Canada.

Career

Commercial model
Bondoc was discovered at age 13 by Louie Aguinaldo, who became his manager. He made his mark as the youngest lead ever in the popular Close-Up toothpaste advertising campaign by the time he was 14 years old. By the time he entered showbiz, he has done over seventeen TV commercials and print ads for some of the most respectable brands in the market including Jollibee, Ivory Shampoo, Eveready, Del Monte 202, Mister Donut, Ayala Center and Oishi.

The TGIS years
Onemig entered showbiz in 1995 and was a mainstay in Viva and GMA Network co-produced shows like Villa Quintana and Ober Da Bakod. However, he only became well known when he joined the teen series T.G.I.S. (Thank God It's Sabado).

He was signed to a nine-picture contract by Viva Films at age 17. His first movie in 1996 with his co-stars from TGIS, Takot Ka Ba sa Dilim? (Are You Afraid of the Dark?), was a breakthrough success. This was followed up with hit films like Where D' Girls R, TGIS the Movie and Silaw, all of which were done from 1996 to 1997.

On television, Onemig became a regular host of the popular noontime show Eat Bulaga! before graduating from TGIS in 1997 and later moved on to roles in shows like Growing Up (spin-off of T.G.I.S.), Ganyan Kita Kamahal (That's How Much I Love You) and Tropang Trumpo in 1997-98.  He was able to work with his idols Aga Muhlach and Mikee Cojuangco in the film Dahil Ba Sa Kanya (Is It Because of Her?). He was launched as a romantic leading man in Viva Films' I'm Sorry My Love opposite Judy Ann Santos in 1998. He also played a young man who witnessed student murders in the suspense film Sumigaw Ka Hanggang Gusto Mo (Shout While You Can) in 1999. He did his last film with Viva, My Pledge of Love, again with Judy Ann Santos before moving to ABS-CBN.

At ABS-CBN
Bondoc signed a five-year contract with the network and had his career managed by ABS-CBN Talent Center (now known as Star Magic). His first TV assignment with ABS-CBN was a one-month episode in the now-defunct drama anthology Star Drama Theatre. He played roles in the show ranging from light to heavy ones. Soon after, he became a regular fixture in the Sunday noontime variety show ASAP and appeared in the light dramedy Labs Ko Si Babe opposite Jolina Magdangal and Marvin Agustin. Though he was busy with television, he was not able to do movies for almost a year since he still had a movie contract with former mother studio Viva Films. At that time he severed ties with Viva and, as a result, he had to wait till his Viva movie contract expired.

Bondoc made a movie comeback in 2000 in the horror trilogy Tabi-Tabi Po of FLT Films where he was paired with another former Viva talent Antoinette Taus; the movie suffered low sales at the box office. However, he made it up by finally making a box-office success movie called Trip with ABS-CBN's movie outfit Star Cinema in 2001. He was quickly given a follow-up movie in 2002, Jologs, which was also a successful hit. He did other projects like Attagirl and Pangako Sa 'Yo while working on Jologs.  In 2003, Bondoc played the closet gay Wilson in the youth-oriented series Buttercup. His last TV series appearance was in 2004 on ABS-CBN's fantaserye Marina. That same year, he starred with the loveteam of Jericho Rosales and Kristine Hermosa in Ngayong Nandito Ka.

At IBC-13
Bondoc signed a two-year contract with the network of IBC 13. In 2005 his final television show called Chowtime Na! showed in 2005 to 2006.

Advocacy
In 2001, Bondoc was named as official spokesperson for youth and students by the National Youth Commission and Center for Students and Co-Curricular Affairs of the Department of Education.

Businesses
During his stay in showbiz, Onemig became an investor in his family's businesses. Among his businesses was the Benedictine International School of Quezon City.

Politics
In 2013, Bondoc unsuccessfully ran for representative at the 2nd district of Bataan under Aksyon Demokratiko.

Filmography

Television
 Sabado Badoo (GMA Network) 2015 - cameo footage
 Tunay Na Buhay (GMA Network) 2014
 Chowtime Na! (IBC) 2005–2006
 Marina as Binggoy (ABS-CBN) 2004
 Buttercup as Wilson Go(ABS-CBN) 2003
 Pangako Sa 'Yo as Errol (ABS-CBN) 2002
 Attagirl (ABS-CBN) 2001
 !Oka Tokat (ABS-CBN) 2001
 Star Drama Presents: Burn (ABS-CBN) 2000
 Labs Ko Si Babe (ABS-CBN) 1999
 Star Drama Theatre (ABS-CBN) 1999
 ASAP (ABS-CBN) 1999–2005
 Ganyan Kita Kamahal (GMA Network) 1998
 Tropang Trumpo (ABC) 1998
 Growing Up Jomai/JM Rodriguez (GMA Network) 1997–1999
 Eat Bulaga! (GMA Network) 1997
 Ober Da Bakod as Bubwit (GMA Network) 1995–1996
 T.G.I.S. as Jomai/JM Rodriguez (GMA Network) 1995–1999
 Villa Quintana as Alfon (GMA Network) 1995-1997

Movies
Volta as Oh-Blah-Blah (Star Cinema) - 2004
Pinay Pie as Elmo (Star Cinema) - 2003
Ngayong Nandito Ka as Derek Cervantes (Star Cinema) - 2003
Message Sent (FLT) - 2003
Jologs as Trigger (Star Cinema) - 2002
Trip as Louie (Star Cinema) - 2001
Tabi-Tabi Po (FLT) - 2000
My Pledge of Love (Viva) - 1999
Sumigaw Ka Hanggang Gusto Mo (Viva) - 1999
I'm Sorry My Love (Viva) - 1998
Dahil Ba sa Kanya (Viva) - 1998
Silaw (Viva) - 1998
TGIS: The Movie (Viva) - 1997
Where the Girls Are (Viva) - 1996
Takot Ka Ba sa Dilim (Viva) - 1996

References

External links
 Onemig Bondoc at Telebisyon.net

1977 births
Filipino male television actors
Star Magic
Living people
Aksyon Demokratiko politicians
Male actors from Bataan
Politicians from Bataan
GMA Network personalities
Viva Artists Agency